Turgutreis is a town in Turkey about a 50-minute drive from Milas–Bodrum Airport. It is the second largest town on the Bodrum peninsula and is part of that district, in Muğla. The town is a popular holiday destination with 5 kilometres of sandy beaches, waterfront restaurants and bars, and is considered a resort town.

The town is named after the Ottoman admiral Turgut Reis who was born there in 1485. Also known as Dragut, Turgut Reis was famous for his expeditions on the coasts of Spain, France, Italy, and North Africa, and for his participation in the Ottoman siege of Malta, in which he was killed. There is a memorial to Turgut Reis a few kilometres from the town centre located in Sabanci Park. The town was formerly named Karatoprak before being renamed in Reis's honour in 1972.

The coastline consists of several inlets, with steep mountains running parallel to the coast. There are 14 Turkish islets around Turgutreis including Küçük Kiremit, Büyük, Fener, Çatal, Yassı, Tüllüce, Kargı, Köçek, Kadıkalesi, and Sarıat, as well as the bigger Greek islands of Kos and Kalimnos. The town has a marina which provides access to the nearby Greek island of Kos via ferry.

Famous residents
 Burhan Doğançay

See also
 Tourism in Turkey
 Turkish Riviera
 Blue Cruise
 Marinas in Turkey
 Foreign purchases of real estate in Turkey

References

External links
 
 Bodrum City Guide
 Pictures of Turgutreis
 Sun City Turgutreis

Gallery

Populated places in Muğla Province
Bodrum
Towns in Turkey
Turkish Riviera
Populated coastal places in Turkey
Fishing communities in Turkey